Eucalyptus patellaris, commonly known as weeping box, is a species of tree that is endemic to the Northern Territory in Australia. It has rough, fibrous to flaky bark on the trunk and branches, lance-shaped or curved adult leaves, flower buds in groups of seven, white flowers and bell-shaped or cup-shaped fruit.

Description
It has rough, greyish, flaky or fibrous bark on the trunk and branches. Flowering occurs from November to February and the flowers are white.

Taxonomy
Eucalyptus patellaris was first formally described in 1859 by Ferdinand von Mueller in Journal of the Proceedings of the Linneany Society, Botany from material collected from the upper part of the Roper River.<ref name="F.Muell.">{{cite journal |last1=von Mueller |first1=Ferdinand |title=Monograph of the eucalypti of tropical Australia |journal=Journal of the Proceedings of the Linnean Society, Botany |date=1859 |volume=3 |pages=84–85 |url=https://www.biodiversitylibrary.org/item/8353#page/88/mode/1up |access-date=28 November 2019}}</ref> The specific epithet (patellaris) is from Latin, meaning "pan" or "knee-cap", referring to the shape of the operculum in the original, possibly diseased buds.

Distribution and habitat
Weeping box grows in open forest and woodland in gentle slopes and on river flats in the Top End of the Northern Territory in scattered locations. Some sources list this species as occurring in the Kimberley region of Western Australia, but recent research indicates that these specimens are a new species, E. xerothermica''.

See also
List of Eucalyptus species

References

Trees of Australia
patellaris
Myrtales of Australia
Flora of the Northern Territory
Taxa named by Ferdinand von Mueller
Plants described in 1859